Redouane Aouameur (born 27 November 1976 in Algiers) is an Algerian metal musician and the lead singer and guitarist of the Algerian metal band Lelahell.

Career 
Over the course of over two decades Aouameur influenced as Algerians emerging metal music scene.

He appeared the first time as a bassist of Algeria's first ever extreme metal act "Neanderthalia" in the late 90s and has gone on to pioneer the first Algerian metal album with the band "Litham". In 2004 he formed "Carnavage", the first Algerian grindcore band.

Today, Aouameur is known as the front man for "Lelahell".

In January 2016, a 52 minutes documentary entitled "Highway to Lelahell" was published. It traces the career of Aouameur, enriched for 23 years, which blends with the history of Metal in Algeria.

Lelahell's line-up 
Redouane Aouameur – Guitar and Vocals

Lemir Siam – Drums

Ramzi Abbas – Bass

Discography

Neanderthalia
Rage by Hate (1996)

Litham
Dhal Ennar (The first Algerian metal album) (1999)
Promo 2002 (Demo) (2002)
Promo 2006 (Demo) (2006)

Carnavage
Carnival of Carnage (Demo) (2005)
The Hairless Fat Carnage Deed (EP) (2007)

Devast
Art of Extermination (2008)

Lelahell
Al Intihar (EP) (2012)
Al Insane... The (Re)birth of Abderrahmane (2014)
Alif (2018)

Metal Against Coronavirus
The First Line (Single) (2021)

External links

References 

20th-century Algerian male singers
21st-century Algerian male singers
Musicians from Algiers
Death metal musicians
Lead guitarists
Grindcore musicians
Algerian songwriters
1976 births
Living people
21st-century Algerian people